Ángel María Cortellini Hernández (1819 – 1887) was a Spanish painter. He received the gold medal of the National Exhibition for his painting, Retrato de señora.

Life
Ángel María Cortellini Hernández was born in Sanlúcar de Barrameda, Province of Cádiz in 1819. He was the son of an Italian from the Piedmont region who had married a woman of Cadiz.  He trained in drawing at an early age before becoming a pupil of Joaquín Domínguez Bécquer. At the age of 17, he traveled to Italy, stopping in Turin, Milan, and Genoa. After two years, he returned to Seville to continue his training, which continued at the Seville Royal Academy of Fine Arts. In 1847, he moved to Madrid, settling there permanently.

The following year, he exhibited at the Real Academia de Bellas Artes de San Fernando and the Liceo Artístico y Literario. After receiving an appointment in 1850 as the honorary court painter, he created portraits of Queen Isabel II and her husband Francisco de Asis de Bourbon.

Awards

In 1866, he received the gold medal of the National Exhibition for Retrato de señora, and a similar award in 1871 for La batalla de Wad-Ras. He died in Madrid in 1887.

Gallery

References

External links

1819 births
1887 deaths
People from Sanlúcar de Barrameda
19th-century Spanish painters
19th-century Spanish male artists